Yannick Kraag (born 16 October 2002) is a Dutch basketball player for Joventut Badalona and CB Prat.

Early life
Born in Amsterdam, Kraag played for BC Triple Threat in his younger years and later for the Orange Lions Academy.

Professional career
In 2019, Kraag signed with Spanish club Joventut Badalona. In his first year, he played in the U18 team of the club. During the 2020–21 season, he played for CB Prat in the LEB Oro. On 1 November, he made his debut for Joventut in a Liga ACB game against Estudiantes at age 18.

National team career
Kraag was selected for the Netherlands national basketball team as part of the roster for the EuroBasket 2022 qualifiers in November 2020.

On 12 November 2022, Kraag made his senior debut for the Netherlands senior team in a 77–96 home loss to Ukraine. He had 15 points and 7 rebounds as a starter.

Personal life 
He is the grandson of Lygia Kraag-Keteldijk, a Surinamese former politician.

References

2002 births
Basketball players from Amsterdam
Joventut Badalona players
Living people
CB Prat players
Dutch men's basketball players
Dutch expatriate basketball people in Spain